Martinić is a Croatian surname, patronymic of Martin (name). Bearers include:
Ante Čedo Martinić (1960–2011), Croatian actor
Ivor Martinić (born 1984), Croatian playwright and screenwriter
Marko Martinić (born 1990), Croatian water polo player
Mateo Martinić (born 1931), Chilean historian, politician, and lawyer

See also
Martinic (disambiguation)
Martinich (surname), likely related
Martinović, also a patronymic of Martin

Croatian surnames